Shamsunnahar may refer to:

People
 Shamsunnahar Mahmud (1908–1964), Bangladeshi writer, politician
 Shamsunnahar (footballer) (born 2003), Bangladeshi footballer
 Shamsun Nahar Iffat Ara (born 1939), Bangladeshi writer, social activist

Educational institutions
 Shamsunnahar-Osman Ghani Shikkha Niketon, a higher secondary school in Kishoreganj District, Bangladesh

Bangladeshi feminine given names